Roland Thalmann (born 5 August 1993 in Romoos) is a Swiss cyclist, who currently rides for UCI ProTeam .

Major results

2016
 8th Tour du Doubs
2017
 9th Overall Tour of Rhodes
2018
 6th Overall Oberösterreichrundfahrt
 8th Trofeo Laigueglia
 10th Overall Tour of Hainan
 10th Giro dell'Appennino
2019
 3rd Overall Tour of Rhodes
 7th Overall Tour Alsace
 7th Croatia–Slovenia
 8th Overall Circuit des Ardennes
 9th Overall Tour of the Alps
2021 
 2nd Overall Tour de Savoie Mont-Blanc
 6th Overall Sibiu Cycling Tour
 6th Overall Tour de la Mirabelle
 7th Overall CRO Race
 8th Mercan'Tour Classic Alpes-Maritimes
 8th Time trial, National Road Championships
 10th Tour du Doubs
2022
 3rd Overall Tour Alsace
1st  Mountains classification
1st Stage 2
 4th Overall Tour of Bulgaria
 10th Overall Sibiu Cycling Tour
 10th Overall In the footsteps of the Romans

References

External links

1993 births
Living people
Swiss male cyclists
Sportspeople from the canton of Lucerne